1st Air Defense Corps() was activated on July 12, 1955, from Headquarters, 12th Public Security Division in Fuzhou, Fujian province. The corps was mainly tasked with the defense of major cities and facilities in Fujian province when Republic of China Air Force had taken control of the air superiority.

In August 1958, along with the formal activation of People's Liberation Army Air Defense Force, the corps was redesignated as 1st Air Defense Force Corps().

The corps was a part of People's Liberation Army Air Defense Force, then a major branch of the People's Liberation Army.

The corps was composed of:
103rd Anti-Aircraft Artillery Division
516th Anti-Aircraft Artillery Regiment
542nd Anti-Aircraft Artillery Regiment
522nd Anti-Aircraft Artillery Regiment
402nd Anti-Aircraft Searchlight Regiment
105th Anti-Aircraft Artillery Division
503rd Anti-Aircraft Artillery Regiment
521st Anti-Aircraft Artillery Regiment
527th Anti-Aircraft Artillery Regiment
223rd Anti-Aircraft Radar Regiment
1st Independent Anti-Aircraft Artillery Battalion of City Defense
225th Anti-Aircraft Intelligence Regiment
401st Anti-Aircraft Searchlight Regiment

From July 1, 1956, 107th Anti-Aircraft Artillery Division attached to the corps.

In July 1957, during the combination of the People's Liberation Army Air Force and the People's Liberation Army Air Defense Force, the corps was redesignated as 1st Air Force Corps.

References

Air defence corps
Corps of the People's Liberation Army
Military units and formations established in 1955
Military units and formations disestablished in 1957
1955 establishments in China